Tracey Scott Wilson is an American playwright, television writer, television producer, and screenwriter. She graduated from Rutgers University with a BA in English and from Temple University with an MA in English Literature.

Early life

Born in Newark, New Jersey, Wilson began writing fiction after graduating from Temple University. Finding herself unable to finish a novel, she decided to take a playwriting class. "I didn't see much theater as a kid, so I had no expectations....It just took me over." Wilson soon realized that she had found her métier and wrote a number of short plays. At the encouragement of her mentor, playwright Chiori Miyagawa, Wilson applied for and won a New York Theatre Workshop fellowship in 1998.  It was also through this workshop that Wilson met Liesl Tommy, with whom she would develop a long-standing and ongoing creative relationship.

Theater career

Wilson's work has received readings at New York Theatre Workshop, Second Stage Theatre, The Public Theater, the Williamstown Theatre Festival and Soho Theater Writers' Center in London. Awards and residencies include two Van Lier fellowships from the New York Theatre Workshop, a residency at the Sun dance Institute Playwright's Retreat at Cross and the Sun dance Institute Theater Lab, the 2001 Helen Merrill Emerging Playwright Award, the 2003 AT&T Onstage Award, a 2004 Whiting Award, the 2004 Kesselring Prize, the 2007 L. Arnold Weissmuller Award and the 2007 Time Warner Storytelling Fellowship. In 2009, she was the writer-in-residence at the National Playwrights Conference at the Eugene O’Neill Theater Center. On February 29, 2014, the Joyce Foundation announced that Wilson was one of the recipients of its 2014 Joyce Awards. With her prize, Wilson worked intimately with a community in Minneapolis, Minnesota, and wrote Prep, which debuted at the Pillsbury House Theater during the theater's 2015 season.

Wilson's productions include Order My Steps for Cornerstone Theater Company's Black Faith/AIDS project in Los Angeles; Exhibit #9, which was produced in New York City by New Perspectives Theatre Company and Theatre Outrageous; Leader of the People, produced at New Georges; Buzzer at Pillsbury House Theater and the Public Theater in New York City; two 10-minute plays produced at the Guthrie Theater in Minneapolis, a 10-minute play produced at Actors Theatre of Louisville, and The Good Negro at the Public Theater in New York City.

Wilson's first major Manhattan production was in 2003 with The Story at the Public Theater. The Good Negro was produced at The Public and then at the Goodman Theater in 2010.  Wilson's Buzzer was produced as part of the Goodman's 2013-14 season and was added to the Public Theater's 2014-15 season in October 2014. The Story and The Good Negro have been published by Dramatists Play Service.

She has taught and guest lectured at Brown University, Yale University, Rutgers University and New York University.

Television and film career

In more recently years, Wilson has left the theater to expand her career into television. Her episode of NBC's Do No Harm aired on August 18, 2013, and she was later staffed on the FX drama series The Americans, for which she was nominated for a Writers Guild of America Award in 2015.  Wilson also received an Emmy nomination in 2018 for The Americans.  Her work on the Americans also earned her a Peabody Award. She was recently a co-executive producer on 8 episodes of FX's Fosse/Verdon, for which she was also nominated for an Emmy.  In 2019, Wilson teamed up with playwright and television writer Bash Doran to write an episode of Channel 4's Traitors.  However, Wilson chose to stay with her television home, and inked an overall deal with FX in 2018.

In 2019, Wilson joined other WGA members in firing her agents as part of the Guild's stand against the ATA after the two sides were unable to come to an agreement on a new "Code of Conduct" that addressed the practice of packaging.

Wilson has penned the screenplay for Respect, the Aretha Franklin biopic released in August 2021. Though the film generally received warm reviews, reviews for her screenplay were mixed.

Works
 Exhibit #9, New Perspectives Theatre/Theatre Outrageous, New York (1999)
 Leader of the People, New Georges, New York (1999)
 Order My Steps, Cornerstone Theater, Los Angeles (2003)
 The Story, The Public Theater (2003) (Published as )
 Neon Mirage, New York International Fringe Festival (2006)
 The Good Negro, The Public Theater (2009) (Published as )
 Buzzer, The Public Theater (2015)

Anthologies

References

External links

Profile at doollee.com
Profile at The Whiting Foundation
"Civil Rights, and Wrongs, in Alabama". Mark Blankenship (The New York Times) article of Wilson writing The Good Negro

American women dramatists and playwrights
Writers from Newark, New Jersey
Temple University alumni
Living people
African-American dramatists and playwrights
American dramatists and playwrights
Rutgers University alumni
Year of birth missing (living people)
21st-century African-American people
21st-century African-American women
African-American women writers